State Route 316 (SR 316) is a primary state highway in the U.S. state of Virginia. The state highway runs  from U.S. Route 13 Business (US 13 Business) at Tasley north to SR 187 in Bloxom. SR 316 parallels an inactive railroad line as it connects the central Accomack County towns of Accomac, Onley, and Onancock with the northern county towns of Parksley, Bloxom, and Hallwood.

Route description

SR 316 begins at a roundabout with US 13 Business and SR 126 in the hamlet of Tasley. US 13 Business heads east as Tasley Road toward Accomac and south toward Onley as Coastal Boulevard, both of which intersect US 13; SR 126 heads west as Fairgrounds Road toward Onancock. SR 316 heads north as two-lane undivided Greenbush Road and begins to closely parallel an inactive railroad line. The state highway passes through Greenbush and Chase Crossing before entering the town of Parksley as Cassatt Avenue. One block north of the town line, SR 316 intersects Bennett Street, which heads east as SR 176 and provides access to the Eastern Shore Railway Museum on the east side the railroad. The state highway leaves Parksley as Hopeton Road and passes through the village of Hopeton on its way to Bloxom. SR 316 enters the town as Bayside Drive and reaches its northern terminus at SR 187 (Shoremain Drive). Bayside Drive continues north as SR 779 toward the town of Hallwood.

Major intersections

References

External links

Virginia Highways Project: VA 316

316
State Route 316